Yves André (born December 11, 1959) is a French mathematician, specializing in arithmetic geometry.

Biography
André received his doctorate in 1984 from Pierre and Marie Curie University (Paris VI) with thesis advisor Daniel Bertrand and thesis Structure de Hodge, équations différentielles p-adiques, et indépendance algébrique de périodes d'intégrales abéliennes. He became at CNRS in 1985 a Researcher, in 2000 a Research Director 2nd Class, and in 2009 a Research Director 1st Class (at École Normale Supérieure and Institut de mathématiques de Jussieu – Paris Rive Gauche).

Research
In 1989, he formulated the one-dimensional-subvariety case of what is now known as the André-Oort conjecture on special subvarieties of Shimura varieties. Only partial results have been proven so far; by André himself and by Jonathan Pila in 2009. In 2016, André used Scholze's method of perfectoid spaces to prove Melvin Hochster's direct summand conjecture that any finite extension of a regular commutative ring splits as a module.

Awards
In 2011, André received the Prix Paul Doistau–Émile Blutet of the Académie des Sciences. In 2015, he was elected as a Member of the Academia Europaea. He was an invited speaker at the 2018 International Congress of Mathematicians in Rio de Janeiro and gave a talk titled Perfectoid spaces and the homological conjectures.

Selected publications
 
 
 
 
 Period mappings and differential equations. From C to Cp: Tohoku-Hokkaido Lectures in Arithmetic Geometry, Tokyo, Memoirs Mathematical Society of Japan 2003 (with appendix by F. Kato, N. Tsuzuki)

References

External links

20th-century French mathematicians
21st-century French mathematicians
Arithmetic geometers
Members of Academia Europaea
Pierre and Marie Curie University alumni
Academic staff of the École Normale Supérieure
1959 births
Living people
Prix Paul Doistau–Émile Blutet laureates